The Soling was a sailing event on the Sailing at the 1988 Summer Olympics program in Pusan, South Korea. Seven races were scheduled. 63 sailors, on 20 boats, from 20 nations competed.

Results 

DNF = Did Not Finish, DSQ = Disqualified, PMS = Premature Start
Crossed out results did not count for the total result.
 = Male,  = Female

Daily standings

Notes

References 
 
 
 

Soling
Olympic Soling Regattas